KCLX (1450 AM) is a radio station broadcasting a classic country format. Located near Colfax, Washington, United States, the station serves the Pullman-Moscow area.  The station is currently owned by Inland Northwest Broadcasting, LLC. The station is the Colfax/Pullman broadcaster for the Mariners Radio Network.

References

External links
FCC History Cards for KCLX

CLX
Country radio stations in the United States
Radio stations established in 1977